Belmundo Regal is the second studio album by Canadian hip hop group Radio Radio.

Reception 
In its review of the album, The Gazette wrote, "Radio Radio is, quite simply, the best hip-hop act to come out of Canada in a while."

The album was a shortlisted nominee for the 2010 Polaris Music Prize, and for the Juno Award for Francophone Album of the Year in 2011.

Track listing

References

2010 albums
Radio Radio (band) albums
Bonsound albums